Władysław Szczepaniak (19 May 1910 – 6 May 1979) was a Polish football player. A defender for his entire career, he played for Polonia Warsaw, where he was the captain. Szczepaniak was one of Polonia's symbols, also he played for the Poland national football team.

Football career
Szczepaniak debuted in the Polish Soccer League debut in 1928 and he played as a forward player. After a few years he moved to defense, becoming one of the pillars of Polonia's team as well as its captain.

His debut for the Poland national football team occurred in 1930, during a game versus Sweden. His career lasted for almost 20 years. His last game, in 1947, was also against Sweden.

Szczepaniak had a toal of 34 caps for the national team, and in most matches was the captain. He participated in the 1936 Summer Olympics, where Poland finished fourth. Also, he was captain in the 1938 FIFA World Cup game of Poland versus Brazil. The game was played on 5 June 1938 in Strasbourg, France which Poland lost 5–6.

During the Second World War, he took part in unofficial football championships, despite the fact that the German occupying forces had forbidden the Poles to organise football matches. Under his leadership, the Polonia underground team became the champion of the Warsaw district in 1942 and 1943.

References

1910 births
1979 deaths
Polish footballers
Polonia Warsaw players
Footballers at the 1936 Summer Olympics
Poland international footballers
Olympic footballers of Poland
1938 FIFA World Cup players
Footballers from Warsaw
People from Warsaw Governorate
Polonia Warsaw managers
Association football midfielders
Association football defenders
Polish football managers